Ochir Vladimirovich Shurgchiyev (born 18 January 1984 in Elista) is a former Russian football player.

References

1984 births
People from Elista
Living people
Russian footballers
FC Elista players
Russian Premier League players
Association football goalkeepers
FC Mashuk-KMV Pyatigorsk players
Sportspeople from Kalmykia